Andreas Tscherning (18 November 1611 – 27 September 1659) was a German poet, hymn writer and literary theorist in the tradition of Martin Opitz.

Career 
Tscherning was born in Bunzlau, now the Polish town of Bolesławiec. He had to change school and universities frequently, due to the Thirty Years War. He attended high school in Görlitz and continued his studies from 1631 to 1635 in Breslau. From 1635 to 1636 he studied philology and philosophy at the University of Rostock. After this he earned his living as a private tutor in Wroclaw, and was an associate of the poet-composer Matthäus Apelt. In 1641, he authored , the first German translation of Arabic poetry. He subsequently returned to Rostock, where he finished his studies with a master's exam and from 1644 was the successor of Peter Lauremberg as Professor of Poetry. He died in Rostock.

Some of his poems were included in Protestant church hymnals, such as "".

In 1642, still during the war, Tscherning published in  a poem Liebet Friede (Love peace). Avoiding his own situation as well as a certain incident and political circumstances in general, the poem observes the rules by Opitz for a reformed poetry in format, rhyme and strictly German language. The meter and form correspond to a logical thread of thinking: the first of five stanzas requests the love of peace, in contrast to Hass und Streiten (Hate and battle), because of God's will as the ultimate reason. The second stanza points out that Christ gained peace by his death, which man should accept by loving peace. In contrast, stanzas 3 and 4 show how man destroys his own well-being by acts of fighting. The final stanza summarizes the arguments.

Poem

Literature 

 
 Borcherdt, Hans-Heinrich : Andreas Tscherning. Ein Beitrag zur Literatur- und Kulturgeschichte des 17. Jahrhunderts. München 1912.
 Bornemann, Ulrich: "Dirck Volkertszoon Coornhert und Tscherning", in: Daphnis 19 (1990), 493-509.
 Dünnhaupt, Gerhard: Andreas Tscherning (1611-1659), in: Personalbibliographien zu den Drucken des Barock, Bd. 6. Hiersemann, Stuttgart 1993, S. 4103-4134 (Werk- und Literaturverzeichnis)
 Hildebrandt-Günther, Renate: Antike Rhetorik und deutsche literarische Theorie im 17. Jahrhundert.  Marburg 1966.
 McDonald, Grantley : ‘The Emblem of Melancholy in Seventeenth-Century Germany: Andreas Tscherning’s Melancholey Redet selber’, in Melancholie—zwischen Attitüde und Diskurs. Konzepte in Mittelalter und Früher Neuzeit, ed. Andrea Sieber and Antje Wittstock (Göttingen: Vandenhoeck & Ruprecht, 2009), 95-118.

References

External links 

 
 

German poets
1611 births
1659 deaths
German Protestant hymnwriters
German literary theorists
People from Bolesławiec
German male poets
17th-century German poets
17th-century hymnwriters
17th-century German male writers